Adriano Ferreira (born March 16, 1974) is a former professional tennis player from Brazil.

Titles (8)

Singles (2)

Doubles (6)

Runners-up (5)

Singles (1)

Doubles (4)

External links 
 
 

1974 births
Living people
People from Bebedouro
Brazilian male tennis players
Sportspeople from São Paulo (state)